Scopula sarfaitensis is a moth of the family Geometridae. It is found in Saudi Arabia.

References

Moths described in 1982
sarfaitensis
Moths of Asia